Eurydoxa advena is a species of moth of the family Tortricidae described by Ivan Nikolayevich Filipjev in 1930. It is found in the Russian Far East, China (Sichuan, Heilongjiang) and Japan (Hokkaido, Honshu).

The wingspan is about 33 mm for males and about 38 mm for females. The forewings of the males are dark brownish black, with numerous pale yellow markings. The hindwings are dark brownish black with bright orange markings. Females have black forewings with pale yellow markings. The hindwings are black with orange markings. Adults are on wing in mid-July in China.

The larvae feed on Picea jezoensis, Abies veitchii and Abies sachalinensis.

References

Moths described in 1930
Ceracini
Moths of Japan